The XMQ-17A ("SpyHawk") is an unmanned aerial vehicle built and developed by MTC Technologies which was intended to be used by the US Marine Corps in order to fulfill a need for an unmanned aerial reconnaissance capability at division level, or "Tier II". Launched from a trailer-mounted pneumatic launcher, the aircraft is powered by a single Honda GX-57 gasoline-fueled piston engine. The SpyHawk purchase was canceled in January 2008, after MTC Technologies was purchased by BAE Systems.

Specifications (XMQ-17A)

References

Unmanned aerial vehicles of the United States
2000s United States military reconnaissance aircraft
Single-engined tractor aircraft
Cancelled military aircraft projects of the United States